"Ven Conmigo" (English: Come With Me) is the first official single by Puerto Rican reggaeton rapper Daddy Yankee featuring American bachata singer Prince Royce from Daddy Yankee's sixth studio album, Prestige  (2012). The single was released to radios on April 13, 2011 and digitally on April 19, 2011. The song was produced by Musicologo and Menes. An English version that featured Daddy Yankee, Prince Royce, R&B/Latino singer Elijah King & former 3LW & Cheetah Girl singer Adrienne Bailon has been released. received and award for "Urban Song of the Year" at the 2012 ASCAP Awards, which are awarded annually by the American Society of Composers, Authors and Publishers in the United States.

Track listing
iTunes digital download
"Ven Conmigo" (feat. Prince Royce) – 3:39
"Ven Conmigo Dance Remix" (feat. Prince Royce) – 3:47
"Come With Me" (feat. Adrienne Bailon, Prince Royce, Elijah King) – 3:37

Music video
The music video for Ven Conmigo was released on June 3, 2011. It has more than 110 million hits on YouTube.

Credits and personnel
Daddy Yankee: Vocals — Writer — Composer
Prince Royce: Vocals — Writer — Composer
Los De La Nazza: Production
Melvin Garica: Trumpet

Charts

Weekly charts

Year-end charts

References

External links
Daddy Yankee's official website
Official Music Video

2011 singles
Spanish-language songs
Daddy Yankee songs
Prince Royce songs
Songs written by Daddy Yankee
Songs written by Prince Royce
2011 songs